USS Chase County (LST-532) was an  built for the United States Navy during World War II. Named after counties in Kansas and Nebraska, she was the only U.S. Naval vessel to bear the name.

LST-532 was laid down on 24 September 1943 at Evansville, Indiana, by the Missouri Valley Bridge & Iron Company; launched on 28 November 1943; sponsored by Mrs. Fred M. Wyatt; and commissioned on 20 January 1944.

Service history
During World War II, LST-532 was assigned to the European Theater and participated in the Invasion of Normandy in June 1944. She loaded troops and equipment including vehicles at Trebah Beach (called Polgwidden in US sources), Helford River, near Falmouth, Cornwall, on 1 June 1944. This location was the most westerly embarkation site for this operation and the distance that they had to travel to rendezvous with the rest of the Operation Neptune fleet meant that these personnel then spent the next 5 days aboard this flat bottomed vessel in the terrible weather conditions that delayed the Overlord landings until 6 June.

Footage taken by a US Army Film Unit on 1 June 1944 shows her together with LSTs 533 and 27 loading at Trebah.

Following the War, she operated with the Service Force, U.S. Atlantic Fleet. The ship was decommissioned on 8 June 1955 and renamed USS Chase County (LST-532) on 1 July 1955.

On 15 April 1967 she was transferred to the Military Sea Transportation Service (MSTS) and served as USNS Chase County (T-LST-532) until struck from the Naval Vessel Register on 10 June 1973. Transferred to the Republic of Singapore in 1973, she was later sold into commercial service as MS Constructors. Her final fate is unknown.
 
LST-532 earned one battle star for World War II service.

References

See also
 Chase County, Kansas
 Chase County, Nebraska

LST-491-class tank landing ships
World War II amphibious warfare vessels of the United States
Cold War amphibious warfare vessels of the United States
Ships built in Evansville, Indiana
1943 ships